Matthew Michael Graves (born 1975) is an American lawyer who has served as the United States attorney for the District of Columbia since 2021.

Early life and education 

Graves was born in Reading, Pennsylvania. He earned a Bachelor of Arts degree from Washington and Lee University in 1998 and a Juris Doctor from Yale Law School in 2001.

Career 

After graduating law school, Graves began his legal career as a law clerk for Judge Richard W. Roberts of the United States District Court for the District of Columbia. From 2002 to 2007, he was an associate at WilmerHale. From 2007 to 2016, Graves worked as an assistant United States attorney in the District of Columbia, where he served in the office's fraud and public corruption section, ultimately serving as the acting chief of the section. From 2016 to 2022, he was a partner at DLA Piper.

United States attorney for the District of Columbia 

Graves was recommended as U.S. attorney by Delegate Eleanor Holmes Norton. On July 26, 2021, President Joe Biden nominated Graves to serve in the role. On September 23, 2021, his nomination was reported out of committee by voice vote. On October 28, 2021, his nomination was confirmed in the United States Senate. On November 5, 2021, he was sworn into office by Chief Judge Beryl A. Howell.

References

External links
 Biography at U.S. Department of Justice

1975 births
Living people
21st-century American lawyers
Assistant United States Attorneys
Lawyers from Washington, D.C.
People from Reading, Pennsylvania
United States Attorneys for the District of Columbia
Washington and Lee University alumni
Yale Law School alumni